Franklin Fry may refer to:

 Franklin Clark Fry (1900–1968), American Lutheran clergyman
 Franklin Foster Fry (1864–1933), Lutheran minister